MysteryVibe is a British-American firm that focuses on sexual health products. It beat Apple Watch at the 2018 Design Week Awards.

History
MysteryVibe was founded by a group of researchers, engineers and designers from Nokia, Philips, IBM and Deloitte. Inspired by trends in smartphones like Nokia Morph, the founders came up with the idea of creating 'platform' vibrators that would adapt to any body shape and vibrate to any pattern. They continued to research for a number of years before formally starting the company in May 2014, when they were incubated by London-based industrial design firm Seymourpowell.. Mysteryvibe later worked with London and Shenzhen based Manufacturing firm RPD International

It released its iOS app on the Apple App Store in December 2015 and their Android app on Google Play in September 2016. Its product, Crescendo, is claimed to be the world's first vibrator that can be bent to adapt to any body shape. Its second product was Tenuto, a wearable vibrator for men.

Awards 
MysteryVibe has won Red Dot, IDA Design, The Drum, Clio, iF World Design, Excellence in Design and the Young Guns award. It won the Design Week Awards over Apple Watch in the 2018 finals.

References 

British companies established in 2014
Sex toy manufacturers
Companies based in the London Borough of Lambeth